Krowiarki  (German Preußisch Krawarn) is a village in the administrative district of Gmina Pietrowice Wielkie, within Racibórz County, Silesian Voivodeship, in southern Poland, close to the Czech border.

The village has a population of 1,100. There is a palace in the village built in the 17th century, later rebuilt on several occasions.

References

Krowiarki